Culture of Washington may refer to:

 Culture of Washington (state)
 Culture of Washington, D.C.